
Gmina Chocianów is an urban-rural gmina (administrative district) in Polkowice County, Lower Silesian Voivodeship, in south-western Poland.

Neighbouring gminas
Gmina Chocianów is bordered by the gminas of Chojnów, Gromadka, Lubin, Polkowice, Przemków and Radwanice.

Villages
Apart from the town of Chocianów, the gmina contains the villages of Brunów, Chocianowiec, Duninów, Jabłonów, Michałów, Ogrodzisko, Parchów, Pogorzeliska, Raków, Szklary Dolne, Trzebnice, Trzmielów and Żabice.

References

Chocianow
Polkowice County